HMS Weymouth was a  light cruiser built for the Royal Navy during the 1910s. She was the name ship of the Weymouth sub-class of the Town class. The ship survived the First World War and was sold for scrap in 1928.

Design and description
The Weymouth sub-class were slightly larger and improved versions of the preceding Bristol sub-class with a more powerful armament.

The Weymouths exchanged the ten  guns of the Bristol sub-class for six additional BL 6-inch (152 mm) Mk XI guns. Two of these guns were mounted on the centreline fore and aft of the superstructure and two more were mounted on the forecastle deck abreast the bridge. The remaining four guns were positioned on the upper deck in waist mountings. All these guns were fitted with gun shields. Four Vickers 3-pounder (47 mm) saluting guns were also fitted. Their armament was completed by two submerged 21-inch (533 mm) torpedo tubes.

The Weymouth-class ships were considered protected cruisers, with an armoured deck providing protection for the ships' vitals. The conning tower was protected by 4 inches of armour, with the gun shields having  armour, as did the ammunition hoists. As the protective deck was at waterline, the ships were given a large metacentric height so that they would remain stable in the event of flooding above the armoured deck. This, however, resulted in the ships rolling badly making them poor gun platforms. One problem with the armour of the Weymouths which was shared with the other Town-class ships was the sizable gap between the bottom of the gun shields and the deck, which allowed shell splinters to pass through the gap, which resulted in  leg injuries to the ships' gun crews.

Construction and career
The ship was laid down on 19 January 1910 by Armstrong Whitworth at their Elswick shipyard and launched on 18 November. Upon completion in October 1911, Weymouth was assigned to the 3rd Battle Squadron of the Atlantic Fleet and was transferred to the 2nd Light Cruiser Squadron in the Mediterranean in June 1913. In August 1914, Weymouth was detached to sail into the Indian Ocean to hunt for the German light cruiser , which was raiding Allied shipping in the area. In February 1915, she was operating off the East African coast as part of operations against another commerce raider, eventually trapping her in the Rufiji River until she could be sunk.

Weymouth was transferred to the Adriatic in December 1915. In 1916 she returned to home waters and was assigned to the 6th Light Cruiser Squadron of the Grand Fleet. In 1917 she was reassigned to the Mediterranean as part of the 8th Cruiser Squadron operating out of Brindisi. She was damaged by a torpedo from the Austro-Hungarian submarine  on 2 October 1918. She was repaired and survived the war. She was sold on 2 October 1928 to Hughes Bolckow, of Blyth.

Notes

Bibliography

External links
 
 Ships of the Weymouth group

 

Town-class cruisers (1910) of the Royal Navy
Ships built on the River Tyne
Ships built by Armstrong Whitworth
1910 ships
World War I cruisers of the United Kingdom